Louis Robitaille may refer to:

 Louis Robitaille (dancer) (born 1957), Canadian ballet dancer and artistic director
 Louis Robitaille (ice hockey) (born 1982), Canadian ice hockey forward 
 Louis Robitaille (politician) (1836–1888), Canadian politician